Romolo Nottaris (born July 9, 1946 in Lugano, Switzerland) is a Swiss rock climber, mountaineer and author of documentary films.

Biography 

Romolo Nottaris is a promoter of the " Alpine style " i.e mountain climbing without high altitude porters, fixed ropes and oxygen masks.
In 1978 he founded New Rock, a trading company for mountain equipment. With the profits of this company Nottaris can finance his expeditions and sponsor some mountaineers like Ueli Steck and the brothers Anthamatten.

In 1983 Nottaris organizes the first expedition from Ticino to the Himalaya. He retourned many times to the Himalaya, in particular with Erhard Loretan and Jean Troillet. Apart from the Himalaya, the Alaska mountains, Patagonia and Antarctica are the regions where Nottaris organizes expeditions and makes documentary films.

Main Expeditions 

 Aconcagua (6962 m), 1977
 Pumori (7161 m) 1978
 Makalu (8462 m), 1981
 Gasherbrum II (8035 m), 1981
 Makalu (8462 m), 1982 with Jean Troillet (Could not reach the summit because of bad weather)
 Mount McKinley (6194 m), 1982
 Mount Everest (8848 m), 1983 with Jean Troillet (Could not reach the summit because of bad weather)
 Makalu (8462 m), 1984
 Mount Epperly (4359 m), 1995 Antarctica with Erhard Loretan
 Pumori (7161 m), 2002 with Erhard Loretan
 Cerro Torre Cumbre (3128 m), 2006. Cumbre is a documentary film with Erhard Loretan 
 Mount Vinson (4892 m) Antarctica
 Monte Sarmiento (2246 m) 2010

Books 

 Pumori: ticinesi in Himalaya del Nepal, Agno, 1980
 Fascino dell'Himalaya: Makalu 8478 m, 1 tentativo invernale: Gasherbrum 2 8035 m, Agno, 1981 (mit T. Zünd)
 Antartide: ancora una leggenda, ADV, 1993 (Text von Gianni Caverzasio, Fhoto von Romolo Nottaris)

Documentary films 

 Cerro Torre Cumbre (Interview with Marco Pedrini, Film with Fulvio Mariani) 1986
 Mountain bike: Aconcagua (7035 m ) (Film with Fulvio Mariani) 1989
 White-Out (Monte Epperly with Erhard Loretan) 1996
 La danza della foca leopardo 
 Tre passi nel regno del fantastico (with Gianluigi Quarti), 2005
 La magia del continente bianco (Film with Fulvio Mariani), 2013

References 

1946 births
Living people
Swiss mountain climbers
People from Lugano